Puslinch may refer to the following places: 

 Puslinch, Devon, England
 Puslinch, Ontario, Canada